Coleophora trilineella is a moth of the family Coleophoridae. It is found in the United States, including Kentucky.

References

trilineella
Moths of North America
Moths described in 1875